The A119 road is an A road connecting Ware and Watton-at-Stone via Hertford.

References

Roads in England